Mulberry is the common name of several trees in the genus Morus. See the list of plants known as mulberry for plants with similar names.

Mulberry may also refer to:

Geography

United Kingdom
 Mulberry, Cornwall, a hamlet in Lanivet

United States
 Mulberry, Autauga County, Alabama, an unincorporated community
 Mulberry, Chilton County, Alabama, an unincorporated community
 Mulberry, Crenshaw County, Alabama, an unincorporated community
 Mulberry, Arkansas, a city
 Mulberry, Florida, a city
 Mulberry, Georgia, an unincorporated community
 Mulberry, Indiana, a town
 Mulberry, Kansas, a city
 Mulberry, Kentucky, an unincorporated community
 Mulberry, Surry County, North Carolina, a census-designated place
 Mulberry, Wilkes County, North Carolina, a census-designated place
 Mulberry, Ohio, a census-designated place
 Mulberry, Oklahoma, a census-designated place
 Mulberry, South Carolina, a census-designated place
 Mulberry, Tennessee, an unincorporated community
 Mulberry, Texas, an unincorporated community in Fannin County
 Hopewell, Red River County, Texas, a former unincorporated community also known as Mulberry
 Mulberry Island, Newport News, Virginia
 Praha, Texas, originally called Mulberry

Arts and entertainment
 Mulberry (film), a 1986 Korean movie
 Mulberry (TV series), a British sitcom
 "Mulberry", a song on the album Blueprint for a Sunrise by Yoko Ono

Education
 Mulberry High School (Arkansas), Mulberry, Arkansas, USA
 Mulberry High School (Mulberry, Florida), USA

Historic landmarks
 Mulberry Plantation (James and Mary Boykin Chesnut House), Camden, South Carolina, USA, on the National Register of Historic Places and a US National Historic Landmark
 Mulberry Plantation (Moncks Corner, South Carolina), on the National Register of Historic Places and a US National Historic Landmark

Other uses
 Mulberry (color), a shade of violet
 Mulberry (company), an English apparel manufacturer founded in 1971
 Mulberry (email client), communications software
 Mulberry (uranium alloy), an alloy of uranium, niobium, and zirconium
 Mulberry garden, a Czech garden
 Mulberry harbour, prefabricated harbours built for the invasion of Normandy during World War II
 , a US Navy net laying ship

See also
 Mulberry Creek (disambiguation)
 Mulberry River (disambiguation)
 Mulberry Street (disambiguation)
 Mulberry Township (disambiguation)